Greater Noida railway station, formerly known as Boraki railway station or Bodaki railway station, is a railway station in Greater Noida, in the Indian state of Uttar Pradesh. It lies on Delhi–Kanpur trunk route.

The government plans to revamp Greater Noida junction and create multi modal transport hub around it over an area of 400 acres.

Greater Noida railway station lies on Delhi Mumbai Industrial Corridor Project.

There is a plan to link Greater Noida railway station to IGI Airport through high-speed metro rail (max speed 160 km/h) which will cover the distance in about 40 minutes. The metro will start at Greater Noida and will pass through Pari Chowk, Badarpur, Delhi, Tughlakabad, Khanpur, Delhi and Mehrauli before terminating at the IGI airport.

References

Railway junction stations in Uttar Pradesh
Railway stations in Gautam Buddh Nagar district
Transport in Noida
Allahabad railway division